Drik Picture Library is a photography agency and picture library based in Dhaka, Bangladesh.

Background
Drik Picture Library was established in 1989 by Bangladeshi writer and photographer Shahidul Alam and Bangladeshi writer and anthropologist Rahnuma Ahmed. The name is Sanskrit for 'vision'. It was set up to provide a platform for local photographers to publish internationally and provides various media services.

Drik is associated with Alam's other large project: Majority World which aims to promote photographers from the global south and ensure fair compensation for their work. Drik is headquartered in Dhaka and has branch offices in India and the UK.

Pathshala South Asian Media Institute
Pathshala, the South Asian Media Institute, was set up in 1998 by the Bangladeshi photographer, writer, and activist Shahidul Alam, as "Pathshala South Asian Institute of Photography". It is affiliated with Sunderland University and Bolton University in the UK; Oslo University College in Norway; Edith Cowan University in Australia; and The Danish School of Media and Journalism.

In 2019, Pathshala introduced a four-year Bachelor of Social Science in photography program in affiliation with the University of Dhaka. Prior to that, the certificates awarded by Pathshala for completion of its educational programs were not recognized by Bangladeshi universities. Its students engage in social movements with their work. The school has received death threats in response to their work.

Students
Student awards have included first prize in World Press Photo Contest, The National Geographic All Roads Awards, and the Prix Pictet. Several students have made it to the Photo District News' 'PDN's 30 2008' Alumna Taslima Akhter has won several awards, including the Best Photographer Award from the 5th Dali International Photography Exhibition in China.

Other alumni include: GMB Akash, Munem Wasif, Andrew Biraj, Prito Reza, Sarker Protick, Saiful Huq Omi, Khaled Hasan, Saiful Huq Omi and.

References

Further reading
Gerhard Haupt and Pat Binder, "Drik: Images for change", Nafas.
"Drik Picture Library", Images against war, Galerie Lichtblick.
Saad Hammadi, "Drik turns 18", New Age Xtra, 7–13 September 2007. Archived by the Wayback Machine on 18 December 2010.
"Drik Picture Library Ltd", photography-now.com. Archived by the Wayback Machine on 10 February 2012.
Indira Ravindran and Laila Duggan, "Case study 1: Drik: Out of focus"; in Jane Foster and Kumi Naidoo, eds, Young people at the centre: Participation and social change (London: Commonwealth Secretariat, 2001).
"Drik/Pathsala – Bangladesh", International Photographers and Researchers Network. Archived by the Wayback Machine on 1 July 2007. "Noscript text reads: UK to Bangladesh Host for Arabella Plouviez and Associate Partner / DRIK and Pathshala are the primary educational and managing agencies for photographic education and photo journalism in Bangladesh and SE Asia. Their programme is delivered in Dhaka and consists of an affiliated course to the University of Sunderland. The organisations design and deliver the major SE Asian photography celebration Chobi Mela to a wide range of international photographers and institutions. They have a long track record of producing exhibitions and projects that provide a wider view of the political and economic realities of Bangladesh."
"New from the Network – 12 September 2007: Events and training: Drik celebrates 18th birthday with new exhibition – Bangladesh Now", Creative Exchange. Archived by the Wayback Machine on 24 March 2008.

External links
Drik website
Drik News

Photography companies of Bangladesh
Photo archives in Bangladesh
Stock photography
Tourist attractions in Dhaka
Photography organizations
Photo agencies
Photojournalism organizations
Artist cooperatives